lll

Domaine Leroy J. Rouse (born 4 July 1989) is an English footballer who plays as a striker for Stalybridge Celtic. He has Football League experience with Bury. He was educated at Saint Ambrose College.

Career

Bury
Born in Stretford, Greater Manchester, Rouse made his Bury debut as a 74th minute substitute for Marc Pugh in the 4–0 league defeat against Wycombe Wanderers at Gigg Lane, Bury in League Two.

On 9 October 2007 he scored his only goal for Bury in a 3–1 win over local rivals Rochdale at Spotland in the Football League Trophy. He played his final game for Bury against Hereford United on 18 August 2009. Then after the 1–0 win at Port Vale he was to be released by mutual consent. A brief statement from Alan Knill on their website read "I'm disappointed to see him leave because the kid's got talent, but you need more than talent to progress in the game", this was after he was late for training on numerous occasions and also having other disciplinary problems with the club.

Hyde
On 24 March 2010, Rouse joined up with Conference North outfit Hyde United. He made his Hyde debut on 27 March, coming on as a second half substitute in the 4–0 defeat to AFC Telford United. Then after a few good performances coming of the bench he earned his first start on 10 March in a 3–2 win over Redditch United. Then next month he made his final appearance for Hyde against Solihull Moors, which ended in a 1–1 draw, also the final game of the season.

In summer 2010, he left Hyde after just half a year and only four appearances for the club, to join their rivals Droylsden along with David McNiven.

Droylsden
He appeared in all three of Droylsden's FA Cup proper fixtures including the 8–2 battering to the hands of Leyton Orient in the second round replay on 7 December 2010. Then on 10 January 2011 he started for Droylsden against his former club Hyde, a game in which they won 3–1 to progress to the semi-final of the Manchester Premier Cup, Rouse had a controversial part to play in their second goal when he appeared to shove Steve Halford in the back before playing the ball across goal to Ciaran Kilheeney.

Colwyn Bay
He joined Colwyn Bay in September 2011 after being released by his former club. After returning to Droylsden between 2012 and 2014 he joined Macclesfield Town.

Career statistics

References

External links

Player Profile at buryfc.co.uk
Player Statistics at hydefc.co.uk

1989 births
Living people
People from Stretford
English footballers
Association football forwards
Bury F.C. players
Droylsden F.C. players
Hyde United F.C. players
English Football League players
Fleetwood Town F.C. players
People educated at St. Ambrose College
Colwyn Bay F.C. players
Footballers from Greater Manchester
Macclesfield Town F.C. players
Ramsbottom United F.C. players